The City of Maryborough was a local government area located in the Wide Bay–Burnett region of Queensland, Australia, containing the urban locality of Maryborough as well as the southern half of Fraser Island (also known as K'Gari and Gari).

History
Wharves were established at Maryborough in 1847–1848 to provide transport for wool from sheep stations on the Burnett River. The town was initially located further south on the Mary River, but moved to its present location in 1852. It was declared a port in 1859.

On 10 March 1861, the Municipal Borough of Maryborough, governed under the Municipalities Act 1858 which had been inherited from New South Wales upon the separation of Queensland in 1859, was proclaimed, becoming the sixth municipal government in Queensland. Henry Palmer was appointed as its first Mayor. On 15 September 1883, the Granville Division was established under the Divisional Boards Act 1879 to serve the surrounding district.

With the passing of the Local Authorities Act 1902, on 31 March 1903 the Borough of Maryborough became the Town of Maryborough and Granville Division became the Shire of Granville. On 7 January 1905 Maryborough achieved City status, and a Town Hall was built on the corner of Kent and Adelaide Streets and became the administrative centre of the City. On 17 February 1917, as part of a restructuring of local government in the Wide Bay–Burnett area, the Shire of Granville was abolished and split between the Shire of Tiaro and City of Maryborough.

The City grew by an estimated 1,119 people in the transfer.

At this time, Maryborough was re-subdivided into eight divisions each with one councillor, plus an elected mayor.

On 15 March 2008, under the Local Government (Reform Implementation) Act 2007 passed by the Parliament of Queensland on 10 August 2007, Maryborough merged with the City of Hervey Bay, Shire of Woocoo and part of Tiaro to form the Fraser Coast Region.

Towns and localities
The City of Maryborough included the following settlements:

Maryborough
 Maryborough West
 Granville
 Island Plantation
 Aldershot
 Beaver Rock
 Boonooroo
 Boonooroo Plains
 Duckinwilla 
 Eurong (Fraser Island)
 Ferney
 Glenorchy
 Great Sandy Strait
 Maaroom
 Poona
 Poona National Park
 St Helens
 Teddington
 The Dimonds
 Tinana
 Tuan
 Tuan Forest
 Walkers Point

Population

Mayors
Mayors of Maryborough include:

 1861–1861: Henry Palmer
 1861: John Purser
1861: John Eaton
 1862: James Dowzer 
 1865: Henry Palmer
 1883: Charles Thomas Powers
1865: Henry Palmer
 1866: George Nightingale
1877: John Thomas Annear
 1878: Richard Matthews Hyne
William Pettigrew
1880: Nicholas Edward Nelson Tooth
1890: George Stupart
 1894: J. Batholomew
1895: Fritz Kinne
 1901: John Norman
 1903: Andrew Dunn
 1906: William Dawson 
 1909: Charles Rabaa
 1914: Andrew Dunn
1915 John Blackley
 1913–1918: Henry James Hyne
 1927: Charles Adam
1933-1939: William Halliway (Billy) Domaine
 1939 - 1950 Robert McDowall
 1950-1955: Cyril Tanner
 1955-1956: Herbert Leslie Jones
 1956–1965: Robert Alexander Hunter
 1964-1970: Ralph Stafford
 1970-1988:John Anderson 
(number of years) R. J. Hyne 
 1988-1991: Ronald James Peters
N. A. Reed 
 1991–2004: Alan Brown
 2004–2008: Barbara Hovard

Notable people
In addition to the mayors listed above, other notable people associated with the local government include:
 Walter Adams, an alderman of Maryborough and a Member of the Queensland Legislative Assembly

References

Former local government areas of Queensland
1861 establishments in Australia
2008 disestablishments in Australia
Populated places disestablished in 2008